The Great Deception is a 1926 American silent drama film starring Basil Rathbone, Ben Lyon, and Aileen Pringle. It is based on the 1915 novel The Yellow Dove by George Gibbs about World War I era espionage, previously adapted as the 1919 film Shadows of Suspicion. This film is currently a lost film. A New York Times review considered "this photoplay possesses an element of mystery and suspense".

Synopsis
It portrays the activities of a British undercover agent Cryil Mansfield, who is in Germany as part of a plan to feed false intelligence to the German high command. His mission is threatened by Rizzio, a double agent who uses Mansfield's American lover Lois as part of a scheme to entrap and execute him.

Cast
Ben Lyon as Cyril Mansfield
Aileen Pringle as Lois
Basil Rathbone as Rizzio
Sam Hardy as Handy
Charlotte Walker as Mrs. Mansfield
Amelia Summerville as Lady Jane
Hubert Wilke as General Von Frankenhauser
Lucien Prival as Von Markow
Lucius J. Henderson as Burton
Mark Gonzales as Maxwell

References

Bibliography
 Parish, James Robert & Pitts, Michael R. The Great Spy Pictures. Scarecrow Press, 1974.

External links

Stills from The Great Deception at silenthollywood.com

1926 films
1926 lost films
1920s English-language films
Lost American films
American silent feature films
First National Pictures films
American black-and-white films
Films directed by Howard Higgin
Films set in London
Films set in Germany
American World War I films
1920s spy drama films
American spy drama films
Remakes of American films
Lost drama films
1926 drama films
1920s American films
Silent American drama films